Larsen Channel is a strait 1 to 3 miles wide between D'Urville Island and Joinville Island, off the northeastern end of the Antarctic Peninsula. Larsen Channel was discovered in 1902 by the Swedish Antarctic Expedition under Otto Nordenskiöld and named for Captain C. A. Larsen of the expedition ship Antarctic.

See also
Gaviotín Rock

References

Straits of Graham Land
Landforms of the Joinville Island group